This is a list of songs written, recorded, and performed by Living Sacrifice, in order of each release:

Not Yielding to Ungodly
 Haven of Blasphemy
 Second Death
 Progressive Change

Living Sacrifice
 Violence
 Internal Unrest
 Second Death
 Obstruction
 Walls of Separation
 Phargx Imas
 No Grave Concern
 Dealing with Ignorance
 Prodigal
 Anorexia Spiritual

Nonexistent
 Emerge
 Enthroned
 Nonexistent
 Haven Of Blasphemy
 ...To Nothing
 Void Expression
 Atonement
 Distorted
 Chemical Straightjacket
 Without Distinction

Metamorphosis
 Void Expression
 Black Veil
 Distorted
 Desolate
 Sacrificed

Inhabit
 In the Shadow
 Not Beneath
 Sorrow Banished
 Unseen
 Inhabit
 Breathing Murder
 Mind Distant
 Darkened
 Indwelling
 Departure

Reborn
 Reborn Empowered
 Truth Solution
 Threatened
 Awakening
 180
 No Longer
 Something More
 Sellout
 Spirit Fall
 Presence Of God
 Reject
 Liar

The Hammering Process
 Flatline
 Bloodwork
 Not My Own
 Local Vengence Killing 
 Altered Life
 Hand Of The Dead
 Burn The End
 Hidden 	
 Perfect 
 Conditional
 New Day (unreleased)

Conceived In Fire
 Imminent War 
 Symbiotic
 3x3 We Carried Your Body
 The Poisoning 
 Send Your Regrets
 Subtle Alliance
 Into Again
 Separation
 Black Seeds
 Ignite
 Distrust
 The Martyr
 Reach For The Sky

In Memoriam
 In Christ
 Power Of God
 Killers
 Enthroned '98

Death Machine
 Death Machine
 The Battle

The Infinite Order
 Overkill Exposure
 Rules of Engagement
 Nietzsche's Madness
 Unfit to Live
 The Training
 Organized Lie
 The Reckoning
 Love Forgives
 They Were One
 God Is My Home
 Apostasy
 Of My Flesh, Of My Heart
 Glasshouses
 Flatline (live)
 Symbiotic (live)

Ghost Thief
 Screwtape
 Ghost Thief
 The Reaping
 Straw Man
 Sudden
 Mask
 American Made
 Before
 Your War
 Despair

 Other Songs
 Overkill Exposure (Rough Mix)
 Something More (Re-Recorded Version)

Credits
 Bruce Fitzhugh - Rhythm Guitar on releases 1-13, Vocals on releases 5-13
 Lance Garvin - Drums on releases 1-13, Percussion on releases 9-13
 Rocky Gray - Lead Guitar on releases 6-13
 Arthur Green - Bass on releases 6-13
 Jason Truby - Lead Guitar on releases 1-5
 Chris Truby - Bass on releases 5
 D.J. Johnson - Bass on releases 1-4, Vocals on releases 1-4
 Matt Putman - Additional Percussion on releases 6-7

References

Living Sacrifice